The Zlin Savage is a series of light sport aircraft similar in construction to the Piper Cub.

Design and development
The Zlin Savage series are strut-braced, high-wing aircraft with conventional landing gear. The fuselage is constructed with welded steel tubing. The wings are constructed with aluminum spars and wing ribs with aircraft fabric covering. Fuel is stored in two wing root tanks. The control surfaces use aluminum skins.

The design is an accepted Federal Aviation Administration special light-sport aircraft under the marketing names of Savage, Classic, Cruiser, Cub, iCub, Cub S, Bobber, Nomad and Outback.

Variants
Savage Classic
Base model for the US light-sport aircraft category. Engines are the  Rotax 912UL, the  Rotax 912ULS,  Jabiru 2200 or the  Rotax 914 turbocharged four-stroke aircraft engine.
Savage Cruiser
Modified windshield, windows, fuselage bottom.

Savage Cub
Zlin Savage modified with Piper Super Cub appearance and features, with optional tundra tires.

Savage Bobber
The baggage compartment is a fabric or leather bag strapped to the airframe.
Savage Cub S
Extended fuselage and larger tail surfaces. The  Titan Stroker IO-340 powerplant was introduced 2013.

Specifications (Zlin Savage)

References

Light-sport aircraft
Savage
Single-engined tractor aircraft
High-wing aircraft